Second Chance is the fifth studio album by American R&B singer and songwriter El DeBarge. It was released on November 30, 2010, by Geffen Records and Interscope Records. It is his first studio album in 16 years and the follow-up to Heart, Mind and Soul (1994). Production for the album took place at various recording studios and was handled by DeBarge and several other record producers, including Ron Fair, Mike City, Michael Angelo, and Jimmy Jam & Terry Lewis.

The album debuted at number 57 on the Billboard 200 chart, selling 21,000 copies in its first week. It remained on the chart for 12 weeks and produced two singles, "Second Chance" and "Lay With You". Upon its release, Second Chance received acclaim from music critics, who complimented its material and praised DeBarge's singing. It was nominated for a Grammy Award for Best R&B Album, set to be presented at the 54th Grammy Awards in 2012.

Background 
The album is DeBarge's first studio release in 16 years, following a period of drug addiction and legal problems. After his release from prison in 2009, he was introduced by his manager, Pete Farmer, to music executives Ron Fair and Jimmy Iovine at Geffen and Interscope Records. DeBarge sang a cappella in his audition for the label. He later said of the meeting and audition, "we put a plan together and the minute I stepped into the studio I was so nervous, but I felt so much power just coming through me soon as I hit the microphone it was like, it was still there". He subsequently signed a recording deal with the label and began working on Second Chance.

Recording 
Recording sessions for the album took place at various recording studios, namely Capitol Studios, Flyte Tyme Studios, House of Music, MAS Sounds Studio, Mischkemusic Studios, No Excuses, Oceanway Studios, Redstar Recording, Shelter Studios, Sly Doggie Studios, Sounds Studio, The Boiler Room, The Boom Boom Room, and Unsung Studios. DeBarge co-wrote and co-produced the album, working with producers such as Jimmy Jam & Terry Lewis, Mike City, Ron Fair, the Avila Brothers, and Kenny "Babyface" Edmonds, who had worked with him on his previous album Heart, Mind and Soul (1994). He also worked with guest artists 50 Cent, Faith Evans, and Fabolous. DeBarge said of the album's music, "There's music to dance to and make love to, music to cry to. I'm starting from scratch, coming fresh. But my sound still embodies the same soulful, intricate harmonies".

Release and promotion 

Second Chance was released by Geffen Records on November 30, 2010, in the United States. It debuted at number 57 on the U.S. Billboard 200 chart and sold 21,000 copies in its first week, the week ending December 18, 2010. It also entered at number 13 on Billboards Top R&B/Hip-Hop Albums. The album spent 12 weeks on the Billboard 200. In the United Kingdom, Second Chance was released on February 11, 2011. It was also released as a two-disc deluxe edition, packaged with a bonus disc of Christmas-themed songs.

DeBarge made several well-received performances and reintroduced himself to the public. On June 27, 2010, he made his first media appearance since his prison release as a surprise guest at the 2010 BET Awards, performing a medley of his earlier hit songs as a member of DeBarge and as a solo artist, including "Second Chance". Subsequently, he opened for recording artist Vivian Green and performed at the 2010 Essence Music Festival in July. Throughout October 2010, he opened for recording artist Mary J. Blige on her Music Saved My Life Tour. He also made promotional appearances on BET's 106 & Park, The Steve Harvey Morning Show, and The Wendy Williams Show, as well as signing events at CD retailers in New York City, Chicago, and Houston during the album's release week.

The album's lead single, "Second Chance", was released on August 17, 2010 as a digital download. It debuted the following week at number 84 on the Billboard Hot R&B/Hip-Hop Songs chart. It spent two weeks on the chart and peaked at number 41. "Second Chance" earned DeBarge two Grammy Award nominations, for Best Male R&B Vocal Performance and Best R&B Song, presented at the 53rd Grammy Awards in 2011. The album's second single, "Lay with You", features Faith Evans and was released on October 25, 2010. It reached number 20 and spent 14 weeks on the Hot R&B/Hip-Hop Songs chart.

In promotion of Second Chance, DeBarge headlined an eight-date national tour in October, coinciding with concert dates for Blige's tour. In December, he toured with recording artist Fantasia and performed on The Mo'Nique Show and The View. He was scheduled to tour during the Spring in the United States with Kem and Ledisi, beginning February 17, 2011, but withdrew after checking himself into a rehabilitation center to address his drug abuse. Recording artist Musiq Soulchild served as his replacement on the tour.

Critical reception 

Second Chance was met with widespread critical acclaim. At Metacritic, which assigns a normalized rating out of 100 to reviews from mainstream publications, the album received an average score of 84, based on six reviews.

Reviewing the album for AllMusic, Andy Kellman called it "one of the year's best R&B albums" and applauded its "sweet love songs — pleasurable, fresh updates of his tried and true approach", adding that DeBarge's voice "remains capable of elevating substandard material, not that there is much of it here". Entertainment Weeklys Mikael Wood commented that "his ethereal vocals still shimmer so effortlessly", and called it "the year's most elegant tell-all". Sarah Rodman of The Boston Globe wrote that "DeBarge simply soars, his feather-light vocals still in top form". Steve Jones of USA Today felt that DeBarge's "sweet, soaring falsetto remains intact, and he has lost none of his knack for writing catchy, romantic tunes". The Huffington Posts Marlynn Snyder critiqued that "the effort to surround [DeBarge] with a mix of both established, hit-making songwriters and producers, and younger creative voices, is a rousing success".

Steve Horowitz from PopMatters claimed that the album's material "succeeds to a large extent simply because it addresses a wide demographic". Mario Tarradell of The Dallas Morning News praised DeBarge's "melodic soul-pop" vocals and described the album as "an elegant effort that updates his style without obliterating it". Okayplayer's E. Esi Arthur wrote that the album "does an efficient job of lining up songs where his unique vocal styling is in the front seat". In MSN Music, Robert Christgau found DeBarge's voice "unspoiled" and said his "special gift has always been combining the boyish innocence of J5-era Michael Jackson with intimations of physical congress. The quirky murmurs, yelps, and coos of his head voice, a high end of unequalled softness and give, sound responsive where Jackson's sound willed. There's a girl there, or just as likely a grown woman. And whether or not El seems manly to you, he's turning her on and vice versa".

Track listing 

Notes
 denotes additional producer
 denotes co-producer

Sample credits
 "5 Seconds" contains elements of "Stay with Me", written by Mark DeBarge and Etterlene Jordan, and "The Show", written by Ricky Walters and Doug Davis.

Personnel 
Credits for Second Chance adapted from Allmusic.

Musicians 

 Nico Abondolo – bass 
 Bobby Ross Avila – bass, celeste, drum programming, drums, guitar, percussion, piano 
 Rick Baptist – horn 
 Charlie Bisharat – violin 
 Chris Bleth – alto flute, oboe 
 Jackie Brand – violin 
 Rob Brophy – viola 
 Roberto Cani – violin 
 Lily Ho Chen – violin 
 El DeBarge – background vocals, executive producer, keyboards, piano, producer, vocoder 
 Brian Dembow – viola 
 Thomas Diener – viola 
 Bruce Dukov – violin 
 Steve Erdody – celli 
 Faith Evans – vocals 
 Nina Evtuhov – violin 
 Matt Funes – viola 
 Julie Gigante – violin 
 Henry Gronnier – violin 
 Trevor Handy – celli 
 Thomas Harte Jr. – bass 
 Gerardo Hilera – violin 
 Hot Sauce – guitar 
 Tiffany Hu – violin 
 Iz – drums, percussion 
 Suzie Katayama – conductor, string arrangements 
 Carole Kleister-Castillo – viola 
 Paul Klintworth – horn 
 Armen Ksajikian – celli 
 Razdan Kuyumjian – violin 
 Tim Landauer – celli 
 Songa Lee – violin 

 Natalie Leggett – violin 
 Warren Leuning – horn 
 Gayle Levant – harp 
 Phillip Levy – violin 
 Jeanie Lim – viola 
 Mario Deleon – violin 
 Leo Mellace – guitar 
 Joe Meyer – horn 
 Vicki Miskolczy – viola 
 Helen Nightengale – violin 
 Robin Olson – violin 
 Aaron Oltman – viola 
 Sid Paige – violin 
 Alyssa Park – violin 
 Sara Parkins – violin 
 Jason Perry – keyboards 
 Robert Peterson – violin 
 Katia Popov – violin 
 Bill Reichenbach – horn 
 Steve Richards – celli 
 Ryan Roberts – bass 
 Shannon Rubicam – background vocals  
 Tereza Stanislav – violin 
 Rudolph Stein – celli 
 Tammy Hatwan – violin 
 Sarah Thornblade – violin 
 Tim Loo – celli 
 Cecilia Tsan – celli 
 Josefina Vergara – violin 
 John Wittenberg – violin 
 Yelena Yegoryan – violin 
 Ken Yerke – violin

Production 

 Michael Angelo – engineer, producer 
 The Avila Brothers – producer 
 Mike City – arranger, engineer, producer 
 Corey Shoemaker – engineer 
 Christian Davis – engineer, producer 
 Kenneth "Babyface" Edmonds – producer
 Ron Fair – A&R, additional production, bass, conductor, drum programming, executive producer, guitar, harmonica, orchestral arrangements, piano, producer 
 Pete Farmer – A&R, executive producer 
 Todd Gallopo – art direction, design 
 Clark Germain – engineer 
 John Goux – arranger, engineer, guitar, producer, programming 
 Alicia Graham – A&R 
 Jeff Halbert – engineer 
 Tal Herzberg – engineer, Pro-Tools 
 Jean-Marie Horvat – mixing 
 Buffy Hubelbank – A&R 
 Bernard Jacobs – stylist 
 Jimmy Jam – keyboards, percussion, producer, strings, vocal engineer 
 John Norten – engineer 
 Tiffany Johnson – product manager 

 Christian Lantry – photography 
 Terry Lewis – producer, vocal engineer 
 Matt Marrin – mixing 
 George Merrill – background vocals, engineer   
 Dwight Mikkelsen – music preparation 
 Mischke – background vocals, engineer, vocal producer  
 Gabe Moffatt – engineer 
 Peter Mokran – mixing 
 Jen Montgomery – design 
 Tal Oz – assistant, engineer 
 Zach Redding – assistant, mixing assistant 
 Sam Salter – vocal producer 
 Les Scurry – production manager 
 Wesley Seidman – assistant 
 Allen Sides – engineer, string engineer 
 Mike Snodgress – marketing coordinator 
 Jeremy Stevenson – engineer 
 Eric Weaver – assistant, mixing assistant 
 Tremaine Williams – engineer 
 Victor "V Dubb" Wilson – producer 
 Ianthe Zevos – creative art

Charts

References

External links 
 

2010 albums
El DeBarge albums
Albums produced by Jimmy Jam and Terry Lewis
Albums produced by Ron Fair
Geffen Records albums
Interscope Records albums